Limit analysis is a structural analysis field which is dedicated to the development of efficient methods to directly determine estimates of the collapse load of a given structural model without resorting to iterative or incremental analysis.  For this purpose, the field of limit analysis is based on a set of theorems, referred to as limit theorems, which are a set of theorems based on the law of conservation of energy that state properties regarding stresses and strains, lower and upper-bound limits for the collapse load and the exact collapse load.

Software for limit analysis
 OPTUM G2 (2014-) General purpose software for geotechnical applications in 2D (also includes elastoplasticity, seepage, consolidation, staged construction, tunneling, and other relevant geotechnical analysis types).
 OPTUM G3 (2018-) General purpose software for geotechnical applications in 3D (also includes other relevant geotechnical analysis types).
 OPTUM CS (Concrete Solutions) (2019-) 3D design and analysis software for both pre-cast and in-situ concrete (also includes elastoplasticity).
 OPTUM MP (2019-) Free 2D concrete slab design and analysis software.
 LimitState:GEO (2008-) General purpose geotechnical software limit analysis application. Uses discontinuity layout optimization.
 LimitState:SLAB (2015-) Limit analysis software application for slabs. Uses discontinuity layout optimization.

References
 

Structural analysis